Wolfram Faust (born 10 March 1964) is a West German sprint canoer who competed during the 1980s. He won a bronze medal in the C-2 1000 m event at the 1986 ICF Canoe Sprint World Championships in Montreal.

Faust also competed in two Summer Olympics, earning his best finish of fourth in the C-2 1000 m event at the 1984 Summer Olympics in Los Angeles.

References

Sports-reference.com profile

1964 births
Canoeists at the 1984 Summer Olympics
Canoeists at the 1988 Summer Olympics
German male canoeists
Living people
Olympic canoeists of West Germany
ICF Canoe Sprint World Championships medalists in Canadian